was a Japanese freestyle swimmer. At the 1936 Olympics he won a gold medal in the 4 × 200 m freestyle relay, setting a new world record.

References

External links 

 
 

1917 births
1988 deaths
Olympic swimmers of Japan
Olympic gold medalists for Japan
Swimmers at the 1936 Summer Olympics
World record setters in swimming
Japanese male freestyle swimmers
Medalists at the 1936 Summer Olympics
Olympic gold medalists in swimming
20th-century Japanese people